Veeramachaneni (వీరమాచనేని) is an Indian surname:

 Veeramachaneni Babu Rajendra Prasad, an Indian film producer and director
 Veeramachaneni Jagapati Rao Chowdary, an Indian film actor
 Veeramachineni Madhusudhan Rao, an Indian film director 

Surnames of Indian origin